The Couzinet 80 was a training aircraft built in France in the early 1930s.

Design
The Couzinet 80 was a four-seat low-wing monoplane of all-wood construction, based on the Couzinet 30.

Specifications (variant specified)

References

Low-wing aircraft
80
Aircraft first flown in 1933